Aaron Prince (born 9 January 1986) is a Trinidad and Tobago boxer. He competed in the men's middleweight event at the 2020 Summer Olympics.

References

External links
 

1986 births
Living people
Trinidad and Tobago male boxers
Olympic boxers of Trinidad and Tobago
Boxers at the 2020 Summer Olympics
Place of birth missing (living people)